Rupert John Molesworth Kindersley, 4th Baron Kindersley is a British peer and businessman.

Life and career 
Kindersley was born in London on 31 March 1955, the son of Robert Hugh Molesworth Kindersley, 3rd Baron Kindersley and Venice Marigold, daughter of Lord Arthur Francis Henry Hill, second son of the 6th Marquess of Downshire. He has two younger brothers and one younger sister. He was educated at Eton College and the University of Toronto. He married Sarah Anne Warde in 1975: they have one son and one daughter. He was with the Toronto Dominion Bank from 1977 to 1980; Midland Bank from 1980 to 1985; the Daniels Group, from 1986 to 1993; Edgemark Capital Group from 1993 to 1998; a stockbroker with Brawley Cathers from 1999 to 2002; and Director and Treasurer at InnLand Hospitality from then.

References 

1955 births
Living people
People educated at Eton College
University of Toronto alumni
British bankers
Barons in the Peerage of the United Kingdom